Dutch Neck is a census-designated place (CDP) in Cumberland County, New Jersey, United States. It is in the northwestern part of the county, in the southern part of Hopewell Township.

Dutch Neck was first listed as a CDP prior to the 2020 census.

Demographics

References 

Census-designated places in Cumberland County, New Jersey
Census-designated places in New Jersey
Hopewell Township, Cumberland County, New Jersey